Kaatrullavarai is a 2005 Indian Tamil language romantic drama film directed by Radha Bharathi. The film stars Jai Akash and Pranathi, with Vadivelu, newcomer S. Suresh, newcomer Madhupriya, Rajesh, Rajeev, Kazan Khan and R. Sundarrajan playing supporting roles. The film, produced by S. Suresh, was released on 1 July 2005.

Plot

Narmadha is one of the leading actresses of Tamil cinema while Bala is her car driver. Bala, who has a stutter, tries his best to protect Narmadha from danger but Narmadha hates the sight of him and doesn't miss a chance to scold him. In the meantime, the carefree young man "Burma" Bala, an ardent fan of Narmadha, wants to marry her. Thereafter, "Burma" Bala and Narmadha's maid Kausi fall in love with each other. After a new misunderstanding, Narmadha orders Bala to get out of her house. Her father Ramkumar then explains to her why Bala worked for them all along despite her insulting remarks.

A few years back, Bala was the son of the village chief and dreamt to become a playback singer. He then left his village and came to Chennai, nobody was ready to give him a chance to sing and all his attempts to become a singer failed. Meanwhile, Narmadha who was still studying in college got an opportunity to act as a heroine in a film. First reluctant, she accepts when she needed money for her mother's heart surgery. During the shooting of her first film, Narmadha and her father Ramkumar met Bala, they felt pity for him and decided to help him. Bala stayed in Narmadha's home and before the death of Narmadha's mother, Bala promised her to make her daughter Narmadha a successful actress. Bala and Narmadha eventually fell in love with each. Later, Narmadha's first film got negative reviews during the test screening, so the film's financier planned to kill Narmadha before its release to create publicity thus making it a blockbuster film. Bala who had listened to his conversation tried to save her from the goons. During the fight, Narmadha and Bala got injured in the head but they managed to escape and ended up in a mass marriage ceremony. Ramkumar who was with them agreed for the wedding and they got married. When Bala's father learned about the wedding, he gave Bala one of his properties and disowned his son. Later at the hospital, Narmadha had been diagnosed with selective amnesia (she didn't remember anything for the past two years) whereas Bala developed a stutter. To release Narmadha's first film, Bala sold his property and paid the film's producer. Upon release, Narmadha received acclaim for her acting by critics and audience alike but the film flopped and Bala lost all his money. However, Narmadha was flooded with offers to act in films. To save his daughter's acting career and her mother's dream, Ramkumar begged Bala to not disclose about their wedding at any moment and Bala began to work as her car driver.

Narmadha, who finally learns of Bala's sacrifices, decides to put an end to her acting career and to live with her husband Bala. Bala and Narmadha live happily ever after.

Cast

Jai Akash as Bala
Pranathi as Narmadha
Vadivelu as "Watchman" Venkatesh
Vennira Aadai Moorthy as Venkatesh's dad
S. Suresh as "Burma" Bala
Madhupriya as Kausi
Rajesh as Ramkumar
Rajeev as Bala's father
Kazan Khan as Mahesh
R. Sundarrajan as Kanakku
Santhana Bharathi as Peethambharan
T. P. Gajendran as Director
Pandu as Ranga
Kumarimuthu as Kumarimuthu
Poongavanam as Rao
P. R. Varalakshmi as Narmadha's mother
Aarthi as Jyothika
Viji Ketti as Bala's mother
Kumaresan as Director Kumar
Vellai Subbaiah
MLA Thangaraj
Ganeshkar as Jackie Chan
Ravi Shanth as Bheem boy
Kottachi
Bonda Mani as Watchman
Singamuthu as Photo album astrologer
Halwa Vasu as Goyyathoppu Ayyasamy
Vengal Rao as Korangu Kuppusamy
V. M. Subburaj as Govindasamy
Vijay Ganesh as Marriage broker
Priyanka as Host
Usha Elizabeth as Maid
P. Vasu in a cameo appearance
Jaguar Thangam in a cameo appearance
Vandar Kuzhazhi Smitha in a special appearance

Production
Director Radha Bharathi who directed films such as Vaigasi Poranthachu (1990) and Kizhakke Varum Paattu (1993) made his return to Tamil cinema after a hiatus with Kaatrullavarai under the banner of Sheeaasu Films. Jai Akash was chosen to play the hero of the film and paired once again with actress Pranathi after Gurudeva (2005). S. Suresh, the producer of the film played an important role and Madhupriya, a debutante acted opposite him, while Vadivelu handled the comedy. Kichas had cranked the camera whereas music was scored by music director Bharani. Speaking about the film, the director said, "the film has a gripping story of an actress kidnapped by a few anti-socials with the hero stepping in to rescue her".

Soundtrack

The film score and the soundtrack were composed by Bharani. The soundtrack features 8 tracks.

Reception
A critic from Sify opined that "What happens when a star struck youngster and producer decides to play action heroes? Kaatrullavarai directed by veteran Radha Bharathi is a badly made film with no logic or storyline". Balaji Balasubramaniam of bbthots.com wrote, "the film has an uncharismatic lead pair, weak cast, unreal characters, unbelievable situations, medical blunders, unfunny comedy, cheap item numbers and vulgar duets". Indiaglitz said, "Jai Akash looks dull and weak while Pranathy lacks any screen presence. The newcomer Suresh does nothing to impress the audience. Vadivelu's comedy too doesn't work" and added, "nothing can save the movie as the director seems to have shot himself in the foot". P. V. Sathish Kumar of nowrunning.com wrote, "Radha Bharathi's loosely coupled screenplay and hackneyed narration are responsible for not attracting the audience".

References

2005 films
2000s Tamil-language films
2005 romantic drama films
Indian romantic drama films
Films directed by Radha Bharathi